Frank Butler (13 November 1889 – 8 May 1965) was an Australian cricketer. He played one first-class match for Canterbury in 1914/15 and three matches for Tasmania between 1921 and 1924.

See also
 List of Tasmanian representative cricketers

References

External links
 

1889 births
1965 deaths
Australian cricketers
Canterbury cricketers
Tasmania cricketers
Cricketers from Melbourne
People from Brighton, Victoria